Radu Aldulescu may refer to:

 Radu Aldulescu (novelist) (born 1954), Romanian novelist
 Radu Aldulescu (musician) (1922–2006), Romanian-born Italian cellist